Edward Percy Parsons (1878–1944) was an American actor and singer who worked largely in the British film industry.

Selected filmography
 Suspense (1930)
 Beyond the Cities (1930)
 Creeping Shadows (1931)
 Strictly Business (1931)
 Happy Ever After (1932)
 Sleepless Nights (1932)
 The Man from Toronto (1933)
 This Is the Life (1933)
 Red Wagon (1933)
 Red Ensign (1934)
 Princess Charming (1934)
 My Heart is Calling (1935)
 The Big Splash (1935)
 Rhodes of Africa (1936)
 The Gay Adventure (1936)
 Twelve Good Men (1936)
 Strangers on Honeymoon (1936)
 Victoria the Great (1937)
 The Song of the Road (1937)
 Non-Stop New York (1937)
 Said O'Reilly to McNab (1937)
 Blondes for Danger (1938)
 The Four Just Men (1939)
 Hi Gang! (1942)
 They Flew Alone (1942)

References

External links

1878 births
1944 deaths
Male actors from Louisville, Kentucky
American expatriate male actors in the United Kingdom
American emigrants to England